Micael Héber Mendes Freire (born 20 November 1994) is a Portuguese footballer who plays for Gondomar SC as a right winger.

Football career
On 26 July 2014, Micael made his professional debut with Feirense in a 2014–15 Taça da Liga match against Beira-Mar.

References

External links

Stats and profile at LPFP 

1994 births
Living people
Sportspeople from Santa Maria da Feira
Portuguese footballers
Association football forwards
C.D. Feirense players
AD Fafe players
Gondomar S.C. players
Liga Portugal 2 players
Campeonato de Portugal (league) players
G.D. Gafanha players